Javin may refer to:
 Javin, Iran
 Javin DeLaurier (born 1998), American basketball player in the Israeli Basketball Premier League
 Javin Hunter, American footballer
 A misspell of Yavin, fictional planet system

See also 
 Javine (disambiguation)